Seán French (29 May 1889 – 12 September 1937) was an Irish politician from Cork city. He was a Fianna Fáil Teachta Dála (TD) from 1927 to 1932.

Hw was born John French on 29 May 1889 in Cork city, son of William French, coach trimmer, and his wife Ellen (née Twomey). After his education at the CBS, St Patrick's Place, Cork, and a collegiate career studying chemistry, he became a partner in a well-known Cork firm of pharmaceutical chemists, Whelan & French.

A merchant and harbour commissioner, French stood unsuccessfully as an anti-Treaty Sinn Féin candidate for Dáil Éireann at a by-election in 1924 for the Cork Borough constituency. When Sinn Féin split in 1926 over the policy of abstentionism, he joined the breakaway Fianna Fáil party, and won the seat at the June 1927 general election — although like other Fianna Fáil TDs, he did not take his seat until 12 August 1927. He was re-elected at the September 1927 election, but did not contest the 1932 general election. He stood one more time, at the 1933 general election, but did not regain his seat.

He served the city and country in many capacities - as a soldier in the Irish War of Independence and in the Irish Civil War, as a member of the Dáil, as an active member of almost every public board in Cork. French was a close personal friend of Lord Mayor Tomás Mac Curtain, who was assassinated in his home by the RIC during the Irish War of Independence and of Lord Mayor Terence MacSwiney, who succeeded him in the office and also following his arrest by the same forces, died on hunger strike in Brixton Prison in 1920. Following the death of MacSwiney, French was elected Deputy Lord Mayor. He was elected to the Lord Mayors chair in 1924, which he held up to his death with the exception of the years 1930 and 1931. An ardent supporter of the cause of Irish Independence, he joined the Irish Volunteers shortly after their inception, and during the Irish War of Independence was 'on the run' being much sought by the Black and Tans. He was interned during the Civil War.

French was Lord Mayor of Cork from 1924 to 1929 and again from 1932 until his death in 1937. French clashed with the Cork Progressive Association (CPA), a lobbyist group made up of businessmen and disgruntled citizens, who had successfully persuaded the government to instigate a public inquiry into the conduct of the Cork Corporation in 1924. French also frequently clashed with the City Manager, Philip Monahan, during his terms as Lord Mayor. 

His son, also called Seán followed him into politics and served as both Lord Mayor and TD in Cork.

References

 

1889 births
1937 deaths
Fianna Fáil TDs
Members of the 5th Dáil
Members of the 6th Dáil
Local councillors in Cork (city)
Lord Mayors of Cork